Jorge Luis Toca (born January 7, 1975) is a former professional baseball player.

Career
He played with the New York Mets from 1999 to 2001. He plays first base and outfield. He bats and throws right-handed. He is mostly remembered for losing grip and letting his bat fly into the stands after swings on multiple occasions.

On May 12, 2005, while playing in the minor leagues, Toca was suspended 15 games for violating the Minor League baseball drug policy.

See also

 List of baseball players who defected from Cuba

External links

Pura Pelota (Venezuelan Winter League)

1975 births
Living people
People from Remedios, Cuba
Acereros de Monclova players
Binghamton Mets players
Charlotte Knights players
Edmonton Trappers players
Estrellas Orientales players
Cuban expatriate baseball players in the Dominican Republic
Langosteros de Cancún players
Major League Baseball first basemen
Major League Baseball players from Cuba
Cuban expatriate baseball players in the United States
Mayos de Navojoa players
Cuban expatriate baseball players in Mexico
Memphis Redbirds players
Nashville Sounds players
New York Mets players
Norfolk Tides players
Olmecas de Tabasco players
Tiburones de La Guaira players
Toledo Mud Hens players
Defecting Cuban baseball players
Pan American Games gold medalists for Cuba
Baseball players at the 1995 Pan American Games
Pan American Games medalists in baseball
Medalists at the 1995 Pan American Games
Cuban expatriate baseball players in Canada